Pennsylvania State Senate District 40 includes parts of Lackawanna County and Wayne County and all of Monroe County. It is currently represented by Republican Rosemary Brown.

District profile
The district includes the following areas:

Lackawanna County:

All of Monroe County

Wayne County:

Senators

References

Government of Monroe County, Pennsylvania
Government of Northampton County, Pennsylvania
Pennsylvania Senate districts